Bunny Campione (born Carolyn Elizabeth Fisher; c. August 1946) is an English antiques expert known for her many appearances on the long running BBC television programme Antiques Roadshow, on which she has appeared since 1987.

Daughter of Squadron Leader Francis Colborne Fisher, of Mudeford, Hampshire, and Iris (née Stewart), sister of British actor Stewart Granger, Campione became known as "Bunny" as a young child after she was given a coat that had a hood with rabbit ears on it; she also later collected soft toy rabbits. She studied at university in France and worked at the Bear Lane Gallery in Oxford for a year. She then worked at Sotheby's for 23 years gaining a wide knowledge of antiques firstly in the furniture department and then the collectors' department.

She was a senior consultant to Christie's, London until 2001. She lives on the Essex/Suffolk border with her husband Iain Grahame, whom she married on 7 July 2002. She runs her own company, Campione Fine Art, buying and selling antiques on behalf of clients. She has a particular interest in, and knowledge of, automata, bird-cages, corkscrews, dolls, dolls' houses, miniature and early furniture, and soft toys.

References

External links
 

Living people
Year of birth missing (living people)
Antiques experts